Inam means gift. 
It may be used  as a given name for a person. It is mainly female but also male when used in compound forms such as Inam-ul-Haq / Enamul Haque. The name is subject to  varying transliterations such as Inaam, Enam and other forms.

Notable bearers of the uncompounded name include:

Female
 Ina'am Al-Mufti (1929–2018), first Jordanian woman to hold a governmental position
 Inaam Kachachi (born 1942), Iraqi journalist and author
 Enaam Elgretly (born 1944), Egyptian actress
 Enaam Elkhoury (born 2013), Lebanese fankalosa

Male
 Enaam Ahmed (born 2000), British racing driver
 Enam Ali (born 1960), Bangladeshi-born British businessman
 Enaam Arnaout (born 1960s), Syrian American who used charitable donations to support fighters in Bosnia without informing the donors
 Inam Ahmed (1922–2003), Bangladeshi actor

See also
 Alexis Enam (born 1986), Cameroonian footballer
 Anam (name)
 Enam (disambiguation)